CFIX may refer to:

 CFIX-FM, a radio station (96.9 FM) licensed in Saguenay, Quebec, Canada
 CFIX (AM), a former radio station (1170 AM) licensed in  Cornwall, Ontario, Canada
 Cefixime, by the trade name CFIX